Khanpur Legislative Assembly constituency is one of the 200 Legislative Assembly constituencies of Rajasthan state in India.

It is part of Jhalawar district.

Birth and extent of the constituency
The constituency was created by The Delimitation of Parliamentary and Assembly Constituencies Order, 1951. It had its first election in 1951. As of the latest delimitation in 2008, it consists of Khanpur tehsil and parts of Jhalrapatan tehsil (including Mandawar, Ratlai, Salawad, Bakani, Reechwa ILRCs and Gagron and Govindpura Patwari Circles of Jhalawar ILRC).

Members of the Legislative Assembly

Election results

2018

See also
 List of constituencies of the Rajasthan Legislative Assembly
 Jhalawar district

References

Jhalawar district
Assembly constituencies of Rajasthan